Levan can refer to:

Places
Levan, Berat, a village in the municipality of Berat, Berat County, Albania
Levan, Fier, a village in the municipality of Fier, Fier County, Albania
Levan, Gjirokastër, a village in the municipality of Memaliaj, Gjirokastër County, Albania
Levan, Utah
 The town of Levan, Inverclyde, United Kingdom
 Levan, Afghanistan
 St Levan, Cornwall, England

People
 Levan (name), Georgian masculine given name

Buildings
 Castle Levan, is a fortified tower house in Levan area of Gourock, Inverclyde, Scotland.

Others
 Levan Farm was listed on the National Register of Historic Places in 1978.
 Levan polysaccharide, a homopolysaccharide which is composed of D-fructofuranosyl 
 A group of fructans produced by bacteria or created by breaking down other kinds of plant fructans, called levan beta 2→6
 LEVAN (Search Engine), an acronym for Learn Everything About Anything, a visual processing search engine developed by the Allen Brain Institute and the University of Washington.
 Albert Levan

LeVan
 C. J. LeVan, U.S. Army Lieutenant General, Army Air Defense Command